Ri Chun-hee (also romanized as Ri Chun Hee or Ri Chun Hui ; born 8 July 1943) is a North Korean news presenter for North Korean broadcaster Korean Central Television. She is most notable for her characteristic emotional and sometimes vitriolic tone, described as "passionate", "vaguely menacing", and "aggressive". She announced her retirement in 2012, but still occasionally presents the news of major developments.

Early life and education
Ri was born in 1943 to a poor family in Tongchon in Gangwon, Japanese Korea. Ri studied performance art at Pyongyang University of Theatre and Film and was recruited as a newsreader by KCTV.

Career
Ri began work onscreen in February 1971, became chief news presenter of KCTV and was consistently on‑air from the mid-1980s onwards. Her career was unique for its longevity; while many at KCTV were demoted or purged, her career was never interrupted. When she announced her retirement in January 2012, she told Chinese media that she would be working behind the scenes and training a new generation of broadcasters. The UK's Daily Telegraph commented that she had been "entrusted with announcing great moments in North Korean history". American journalist and author Bob Woodward referred to her as North Korea's Walter Cronkite in his 2018 book Fear: Trump in the White House.

Ri came out of retirement to announce major news stories. She announced North Korea's claim to have carried out an H-bomb detonation in January 2016 and a missile launch in February 2016. She also announced the nuclear tests of September 2016, September 2017 and the missile test in November 2017. Later, she announced the suspension of North Korean nuclear and intercontinental ballistic testing in April 2018 and the Singapore summit between Kim and Donald Trump in June 2018. On April 15, 2018, Ri read a report that named Kim Jong-un's wife, Ri Sol-ju, as the "First Lady" for the first time.

In 2022, Kim gave luxury houses to Ri and other North Korean elites. Ri narrated a state media video of Kim giving her a tour of her new Pyongyang home.

Style
Ri has received high acclaim from the North Korean regime for her resonant voice, impressive mood and outstanding eloquence. She is known for her melodramatic announcing style. She often speaks in a wavering and exuberant tone when praising the nation's leaders, and conversely with visible anger when denouncing its enemies. According to Brian Reynolds Myers, a professor at Dongseo University and an expert in North Korean propaganda, her training in drama serves her well, given the large amount of showmanship that is typical of North Korean broadcasting.

When she made the official announcement of Kim Il-sung's death in 1994, Ri was visibly crying during the broadcast. Likewise, when she announced Kim Jong-il's death in 2011, she was seen holding back tears. Ri usually appears wearing either a pink Western-style suit or in a traditional Korean joseon-ot. She is nicknamed the "Pink Lady" and "North Korean News Lady".

References

Further reading 
 

1943 births
Living people
People from Tongchon County
Korean television personalities
North Korean propagandists